Adrian Wielgat (born 10 February 1993) is a Polish speed skater. He competed in the men's 5000 metres at the 2018 Winter Olympics.

References

External links
 

1993 births
Living people
Polish male speed skaters
Olympic speed skaters of Poland
Speed skaters at the 2018 Winter Olympics
People from Elbląg